Yavapai County is near the center of the U.S. state of Arizona. As of the 2020 census, its population was 236,209, making it the fourth-most populous county in Arizona. The county seat is Prescott.

Yavapai County comprises the Prescott, AZ Metropolitan Statistical Area as well as the northern portions of Peoria and Wickenburg, the balance of which are in the Phoenix Metropolitan Area.

History

Yavapai County was one of the four original Arizona counties created by the 1st Arizona Territorial Legislature. The county territory was defined as being east of longitude 113° 20' and north of the Gila River. Soon thereafter, the counties of Apache, Coconino, Maricopa, and Navajo were carved from the original Yavapai County. Yavapai County's present boundaries were established in 1891.

The county is named after the Yavapai people, who were the principal inhabitants at the time the United States annexed the area.

County level law enforcement services have been provided by Yavapai County Sheriff's Office since 1864.

Geography
It has about 93% of the area of the U.S. state of New Jersey. It is larger than three U.S. states (Rhode Island, Delaware and Connecticut) and the District of Columbia combined.

The county's topography makes a dramatic transition from the lower Sonoran Desert to the south to the heights of the Coconino Plateau to the north, and the Mogollon Rim to the east. The highest point above sea level (MSL) in Yavapai County is Mount Union at an elevation of 7,979 ft (2,432 m) and the lowest is Agua Fria River drainage, now under Lake Pleasant.

Adjacent counties
 Mohave Countywest
 La Paz Countysouthwest
 Maricopa Countysouth
 Gila Countysouth/southeast 
 Coconino Countynorth/northeast

Major highways

  Interstate 17
  Interstate 40
  U.S. Route 93
  State Route 69
  State Route 71
  State Route 89
  State Route 169
  State Route 179
  State Route 260
  State Route 279

National protected areas

 Agua Fria National Monument
 Coconino National Forest (part)
 Kaibab National Forest (part)
 Montezuma Castle National Monument
 Prescott National Forest (part)
 Tonto National Forest (part)
 Tuzigoot National Monument

There are nineteen official wilderness areas in Yavapai County that are part of the National Wilderness Preservation System. Fourteen of these are integral parts of National Forests listed above, whereas five are managed by the Bureau of Land Management. Some of these extend into neighboring counties (as indicated below):
 Apache Creek Wilderness (Prescott NF)
 Arrastra Mountain Wilderness (BLM) mostly in Mohave County; also partly in La Paz County
 Castle Creek Wilderness (Prescott NF)
 Cedar Bench Wilderness (Prescott NF)
 Fossil Springs Wilderness (Coconino NF) mostly in Coconino County
 Granite Mountain Wilderness (Arizona) (Prescott NF)
 Hassayampa River Canyon Wilderness (BLM)
 Hells Canyon Wilderness (Arizona) (BLM) partly in Maricopa County
 Juniper Mesa Wilderness (Prescott NF)
 Mazatzal Wilderness (Tonto NF / Coconino NF) partly in Gila County; Maricopa County
 Munds Mountain Wilderness (Coconino NF) mostly in Coconino County
 Pine Mountain Wilderness (Tonto NF/Prescott NF)
 Red Rock-Secret Mountain Wilderness (Coconino NF) partly in Coconino County
 Sycamore Canyon Wilderness (Prescott NF/Coconino NF / Kaibab NF) mostly in Coconino County
 Tres Alamos Wilderness (BLM)
 Upper Burro Creek Wilderness (BLM) partly in Mohave County
 West Clear Creek Wilderness (Coconino NF) partly in Coconino County
 Wet Beaver Wilderness (Coconino NF) partly in Coconino County
 Woodchute Wilderness (Prescott NF)

Land ownership and management
 Private ownership: about 25% of Yavapai County's land (by area) is privately owned.
 Public land: about 75% of the county's area is publicly owned, including
Federal ownership: about 50% of the county's area is owned by the federal government of the United States, including
National Forest lands, managed by the US Forest Service: 38% of the county's area
Federal lands managed by the U.S. Bureau of Land Management: 11.6% of the county's area
Small areas of federal land are managed by the U.S. Bureau of Indian Affairs and the National Park Service: less than 0.5% of the county's area.
Yavapai-Prescott Tribe 
Yavapai-Apache Nation 
About 25% of Yavapai County is owned by the State of Arizona as state trust lands, managed by the Arizona State Land Department.

Flora and fauna
There are numerous flora and fauna species within Yavapai County. For example, a number of plants within the genus Ephedra and Coreopsis are found in the county. Yavapai County is also the location of several groves of the near-threatened California Fan Palm, Washingtonia filifera.

Attractions

Yavapai County is home to Arcosanti, a prototype arcology, developed by Paolo Soleri, and under construction since 1970.  Arcosanti is just north of Cordes Junction, Arizona.

Out of Africa Wildlife Park is a private zoo. The park moved to the Camp Verde area from the East Valley in 2005.

Demographics

2000 census
As of the census of 2000, there were 167,517 people, 70,171 households, and 46,733 families living in the county. The racial makeup of the county was 91.9% White, 0.4% Black or African American, 1.6% Native American, 0.5% Asian, 0.1% Pacific Islander, 3.6% from other races, and 2.0% from two or more races.  9.8% of the population were Hispanic or Latino of any race.

There were 70,171 households, out of which 23.8% had children under the age of 18 living with them, 55.0% were married couples living together, 8.1% had a female householder with no husband present, and 33.4% were non-families. 26.7% of all households were made up of individuals, and 12.4% had someone living alone who was 65 years of age or older.  The average household size was 2.33 and the average family size was 2.79.

In the county, the population was spread out, with 21.1% under the age of 18, 7.1% from 18 to 24, 22.4% from 25 to 44, 27.4% from 45 to 64, and 22.0% who were 65 years of age or older.  The median age was 44 years. For every 100 females there were 96.2 males.  For every 100 females age 18 and over, there were 93.5 males.

The median income for a household in the county was $34,901, and the median income for a family was $40,910. Males had a median income of $30,738 versus $22,114 for females. The per capita income for the county was $19,727.  About 7.9% of families and 11.9% of the population were below the poverty line, including 15.9% of those under age 18 and 6.7% of those age 65 or over.

Yavapai County is defined as the Prescott Metropolitan Statistical Area by the United States Census Bureau.

2010 census
As of the census of 2010, there were 211,033 people, 90,903 households, and 57,597 families living in the county. The racial makeup of the county was 89.3% white, 1.7% American Indian, 0.8% Asian, 0.6% black or African American, 0.1% Pacific islander, 4.9% from other races, and 2.5% from two or more races. Those of Hispanic or Latino origin made up 13.6% of the population. The largest ancestry groups were:

 22.5% German
 16.0% Irish
 15.8% English
 11.5% Mexican
 5.4% Italian
 5.0% American
 4.7% French
 3.4% Scottish
 3.1% Polish
 2.9% Swedish
 2.6% Norwegian
 2.6% Scotch-Irish
 2.5% Dutch
 1.2% Russian
 1.0% Welsh
 1.0% Danish

Of the 90,903 households, 22.8% had children under the age of 18 living with them, 50.3% were married couples living together, 9.0% had a female householder with no husband present, 36.6% were non-families, and 29.1% of all households were made up of individuals. The average household size was 2.28 and the average family size was 2.78. The median age was 49.2 years.

The median income for a household in the county was $43,290 and the median income for a family was $53,499. Males had a median income of $40,854 versus $31,705 for females. The per capita income for the county was $25,527. About 8.8% of families and 13.7% of the population were below the poverty line, including 20.1% of those under age 18 and 6.1% of those age 65 or over.

Politics
Yavapai has historically been the most Republican county in Arizona, though it has become rivalled by Graham and exceeded by Mohave since the turn of the century. No Democratic presidential nominee has won Yavapai County since Harry S. Truman in 1948, and even when the county did go Democratic in the Truman and Roosevelt eras, it typically did so by a smaller margin than any other county in the state.

Communities

Cities

 Cottonwood
 Peoria (mostly in Maricopa County)
 Prescott (county seat)
 Sedona (partly in Coconino County)

Towns

 Camp Verde
 Chino Valley
 Clarkdale
 Dewey-Humboldt
 Jerome
 Prescott Valley
 Wickenburg (partly in Maricopa County)

Census-designated places

 Ash Fork
 Bagdad
 Black Canyon City
 Congress
 Cordes Lakes
 Cornville
 Lake Montezuma
 Mayer
 Paulden
 Peeples Valley
 Seligman
 Spring Valley
 Verde Village
 Village of Oak Creek
 Wilhoit
 Williamson
 Yarnell

Indian communities
 Yavapai-Apache Nation
 Yavapai-Prescott Tribe

Unincorporated communities

 Arcosanti
 Bumble Bee
 Cherry
 Cleator
 Clemenceau
 Cordes
 Crown King
 Drake
 Iron Springs
 Kirkland
 Ponderosa Park
 Skull Valley
 Tip Top

Ghost towns

 Alexandra
 American Ranch
 Apron Crossing
 Big Bug
 Bradshaw City
 Bumble Bee
 Chaparral
 Catoctin
 Cherry
 Cleator
 Clemenceau
 Congress
 Cordes
 Curtis
 Gillett
 Jerome Junction
 Octave
 Simmons
 Stanton
 Stoddard
 Tip Top
 Weaver

Geographic features
 Sunset Point is a cliff adjacent to Interstate 17. The Sunset Point Rest Area, located at the top of the cliff, provides travelers with a scenic view.

County population ranking
The population ranking of the following table is based on the 2010 census of Yavapai County.

† county seat

Education
School districts include:

Unified:

 Ash Fork Joint Unified District
 Bagdad Unified School District
 Camp Verde Unified District
 Chino Valley Unified District
 Humboldt Unified District
 Mayer Unified District
 Prescott Unified District
 Seligman Unified District
 Sedona-Oak Creek Joint Unified District
 Wickenburg Unified District

Secondary:
 Mingus Union High School District

Elementary:

 Beaver Creek Elementary District
 Canon Elementary District
 Clarkdale-Jerome Elementary District
 Congress Elementary District
 Cottonwood-Oak Creek Elementary District
 Crown King Elementary District
 Hillside Elementary District
 Kirkland Elementary District
 Pine Strawberry Elementary District
 Skull Valley Elementary District
 Williamson Valley Elementary School District
 Yarnell Elementary District

Former school districts:
 Walnut Grove Elementary District - Closed in 2021

See also

 National Register of Historic Places listings in Yavapai County, Arizona

Citations

General sources
 Fuis, G. S. (1996). The geology and mechanics of formation of the Fort Rock dome, Yavapai County, Arizona. U.S. Geological Survey Professional Paper 1266. Washington, D.C.: U.S. Geological Survey, U.S. Department of the Interior. .

External links

 
 Yavapai County Profile by Arizona Department of Commerce
 Prescott eNewsoriginal local news Web site for Prescott (the county seat) and the surrounding communities.
 Yavapai County government website

 
Arizona placenames of Native American origin
1864 establishments in Arizona Territory
Populated places established in 1864